Barkhuizen is a surname. Notable people with the surname include:

Brandon Barkhuizen (born 1990), South African footballer
Johan Barkhuizen (born 1982), South African cricketer
Tom Barkhuizen (born 1993), English footballer

See also
Barkhuizen v Napier, South African legal case